Vania King and Yaroslava Shvedova were the defending champions but lost in the second round to Sabine Lisicki and Samantha Stosur.

Květa Peschke and Katarina Srebotnik defeated Lisicki and Stosur in the final, 6–3, 6–1 to win the ladies' doubles tennis title at the 2011 Wimbledon Championships. It was the first Grand Slam title for the veteran couple, and allowed them to take the No. 1 ranking.

Seeds

  Vania King /  Yaroslava Shvedova (second round)
  Květa Peschke /  Katarina Srebotnik (champions)
  Liezel Huber /  Lisa Raymond (quarterfinals)
  Sania Mirza /  Elena Vesnina (semifinals)
  Bethanie Mattek-Sands /  Meghann Shaughnessy (second round)
  Nadia Petrova /  Anastasia Rodionova (quarterfinals)
  Andrea Hlaváčková /  Lucie Hradecká (first round)
  Peng Shuai /  Zheng Jie (quarterfinals)
  Julia Görges /  Maria Kirilenko (first round)
  Iveta Benešová /  Barbora Záhlavová-Strýcová (third round)
  María José Martínez Sánchez /  Anabel Medina Garrigues (second round)
  Chan Yung-jan /  Monica Niculescu (second round)
  Daniela Hantuchová /  Agnieszka Radwańska (third round)
  Cara Black /  Shahar Pe'er (third round)
  Chuang Chia-jung /  Hsieh Su-wei (first round)
  Olga Govortsova /  Alla Kudryavtseva (second round)

Qualifying

Draw

Finals

Top half

Section 1

Section 2

Bottom half

Section 3

Section 4

References

External links

2011 Wimbledon Championships on WTAtennis.com
2011 Wimbledon Championships – Women's draws and results at the International Tennis Federation

Women's Doubles
Wimbledon Championship by year – Women's doubles
Wimbledon Championships
Wimbledon Championships